Lyn Erhard, better known under the pen name of Charlotte Chandler, is an American biographer and playwright.<ref>{{cite news|last=Gussom|first=Mel| 
url=https://www.nytimes.com/1986/09/24/theater/theater-nightingale.html|title=Theater—'Nightingale|date=24 September 1986|work=The New York Times}}</ref> Chandler authored biographies of Groucho Marx, Federico Fellini, Billy Wilder, Bette Davis, Marlene Dietrich, Joan Crawford, Ingrid Bergman, Mae West and Alfred Hitchcock.

A resident of New York City, Chandler is a member of the board of Film at Lincoln Center. 

Selected works

 (1978). 
 (1984). 
 (1986). Confessions of a Nightingale, a one-person play that utilizes parts of her biography on Tennessee Williams's The Ultimate Seduction.
 (1995). 
 (2002). 
 (2005). 
 (2006) The Girl Who Walked Home Alone: Bette Davis, A Personal Biography'': New York; Simon & Schuster.
 (2007). 
 (2008). 
 (2011).

References

American biographers
Living people
Year of birth missing (living people)
American women biographers
21st-century American women